Jeffrey Dwayne Daniels (born June 24, 1968) is a Canadian former professional ice hockey player and current assistant coach to the Carolina Hurricanes. He was the former head coach and general manager of the Charlotte Checkers of the American Hockey League. In 2010–11, Daniels led the Charlotte Checkers to 44 wins and 94 points during the regular-season, the best totals for a Carolina affiliate since 2004–05. Daniels then guided the Checkers to the Eastern Conference Final, the deepest Calder Cup playoff run for Carolina’s AHL team since the 1996–97 Springfield Falcons.

Prior to being appointed to his current post, Daniels spent four seasons with the Hurricanes as an assistant coach. He helped guide the Hurricanes to the 2006 Stanley Cup championship, marking the second time he captured the Stanley Cup in his hockey career, as he also has his name inscribed on the Cup as a player with the 1992 Pittsburgh Penguins.

Playing career
As a youth, he played in the 1981 Quebec International Pee-Wee Hockey Tournament with a minor ice hockey team from Oshawa. He later played junior ice hockey with his hometown Oshawa Generals.

Daniels was selected by the Pittsburgh Penguins in the sixth round, 109th overall in the 1986 NHL Entry Draft. He has two Stanley Cup rings with the Pittsburgh Penguins in 1991, and 1992. Daniels' name was engraved on the Cup in 1992, even though he only played two games, and did not qualify to be on the Stanley Cup. In his 15-year professional playing career as a forward, Daniels spent time with the Pittsburgh, Florida, Nashville and Carolina organizations. He played in 425 NHL regular-season games, scoring 17 goals and 26 assists (43 points), and 41 Stanley Cup Playoff games, where he totalled three goals and five assists (8 points). He played in the Hurricanes organization for six seasons, tallying eight goals and 12 assists (20 points) in 272 regular season games, and three assists in 29 playoff games, while making a trip to the Stanley Cup Finals in 2002.

Coaching career
Daniels retired as a player on Nov. 20, 2003. On June 9, 2008, Daniels was named the head coach and general manager for the Albany River Rats. In 2010–11, Daniels led the Charlotte Checkers to 44 wins and 94 points during the regular-season, the best totals for a Carolina affiliate since 2004–05. Daniels then guided the Checkers to the Eastern Conference Final, the deepest Calder Cup playoff run for Carolina’s AHL team since the 1996–97 Springfield Falcons.

Daniels coached the Hurricanes' AHL affiliates the River Rats and the Checkers from 2008 to 2015, with a record of 268-225-51. At the time the Hurricanes announced his position as assistant coach, he was a director of pro scouting for the team.

Prior to being appointed to his current post, Daniels spent four seasons with the Hurricanes as an assistant coach. He helped guide the Hurricanes to the 2006 Stanley Cup championship, marking the second time he captured the Stanley Cup in his hockey career, as he also has his name inscribed on the Cup as a player with the 1992 Pittsburgh Penguins.

Career statistics

References

External links 

1968 births
Living people
Canadian ice hockey left wingers
Carolina Hurricanes coaches
Carolina Hurricanes players
Carolina Hurricanes scouts
Florida Panthers players
Hartford Whalers players
Ice hockey people from Ontario
Nashville Predators players
Oshawa Generals players
Pittsburgh Penguins draft picks
Pittsburgh Penguins players
Sportspeople from Oshawa
Springfield Falcons players
Stanley Cup champions
Canadian ice hockey coaches